O filos mou o Lefterakis (Greek: , Alternate translations: My Friend, Lefterakis or Lefterakis, My Friend) is a 1963 Greek comedy film starring Dinos Iliopoulos, Kostas Voutsas and Maro Kontou.

Plot
Thodoros (Dinos Iliopoulos) is an affluent civil engineer married to Fofo (Maro Kontou). Thodoros has "invented" an out-of-town friend, Lefterakis, who conveniently happens to be in Athens every time Thodoros wants to have a night out with his mistress.

One evening, while in the middle of a card game with his friend Thanassis (Giorgos Konstantinou), he starts explaining his scam to him. However, they are interrupted by the maid, who announces that Lefterakis has just arrived from Patras. Fofo, apparently oblivious to her husband's horror and Thanassis' confusion, invites Lefterakis (Kostas Voutsas) to spend a couple of days at their place.

Over the next couple of days, Thodoros is becoming more and more paranoid, as he first suspects that someone is playing a prank on him, then that he's being blackmailed, and, as the fake Lefterakis seems to know a lot of details about him, that he's indeed losing his mind.

In the end, it is revealed that Fofo has known about Thodoros's infidelities and the invention of "Lefterakis" for a while. Fofo has planned the whole thing to teach him a lesson, asking a friend to impersonate "Lefterakis". The couple finally decides to put their differences aside when Fofo announces she's pregnant.

Cast
Dinos Iliopoulos ..... Thodorakis / Theodoros Vlassis
Kostas Voutsas ..... Lefterakis / Eleftherios Tsambardis / Babis Davos
Maro Kontou ..... Fofo Vlassi
Giorgos Konstantinou ..... Thanassis Kadris
Kaiti Panou ..... Eleni Kadri
Christos Tsaganeas ..... Dr. Karatzamoulis
Nikitas Platis ..... Madman
Katerina Yioulaki ..... Katina
Margarita Athanasiou ..... Rena

Box office

The movie sold 61,734 tickets.

Music
Songs: Mary-Linda, Manolis Hiotis and the Broyer sisters (Errika and Margarita)

External links

1963 films
1963 comedy films
Greek comedy films
1960s Greek-language films